In chemistry, a carbonium ion is any cation that has a pentacoordinated carbon atom. The name carbonium may also be used for the simplest member of the class, properly called methanium, where the carbon atom is covalently bonded to five hydrogen atoms.

The next simplest carbonium ions after methanium have two carbon atoms. Ethynium, or protonated acetylene , and ethenium  are usually classified in other families. The ethanium ion  has been studied as an extremely rarefied gas by infrared spectroscopy. The isomers of octonium (protonated octane) have been studied. The carbonium ion has a planar geometry.

In older literature, the name "carbonium ion" was used for what is today called carbenium. The current definitions were proposed by the chemist George Andrew Olah in 1972 and are now widely accepted.

A stable carbonium ion is the complex pentakis(triphenylphosphinegold(I))methanium , produced by Schmidbauer and others.

Preparation
Carbonium ions can be obtained by treating alkanes with very strong acids. Industrially, they are formed in the refining of petroleum during primary thermal cracking (Haag-Dessau mechanism).

See also 
Fluxional molecules
More carbonium ions called non-classical ions are found in certain norbornyl systems
Onium compounds
Carbenium ion

References 

Reactive intermediates
Carbocations